The Mitsui Shopping Park LaLaport Bukit Bintang City Centre (Japanese: 三井ショッピングパークららぽーと ブキッ・ビンタンシティセンター, Mitsui shoppingupāku rarapo ̄ to buki~tsu Bintan shiti sentā), also known as LaLaport Bukit Bintang City Centre and LaLaport BBCC, is a Japanese lifestyle shopping mall located within Bukit Bintang City Centre (BBCC). It is a RM1.6 billion mall under a joint venture agreement between BBCC Development Sdn Bhd and Mitsui Fudosan Co. Ltd. (Asia), a real estate company based in Tokyo by the Mitsui Group. It consists of approximately 400 stores spanning across 82,600 square metres of retail floor space.

The mall is also connected to the entertainment hub of BBCC on the east which consists of Golden Screen Cinemas, Zepp Kuala Lumpur, Malaysia Grand Bazaar and Grand Banquet Hall. Among the Japanese stores to first open in Malaysia include electronic store brand Nojima, household brand Nitori, Zoff, Mini One by DONQ, pet shop Coo&RIKU, Matcha Eight, Shin'Labo, Tamaruya Honten Steakhouse, Nitinagin&Co, Star Child and Yakiniku Sizzle by YAKINIQUEST. A cafeteria and depachika food hall based on Japanese basement-level F&B are located on the lower ground floor named Depachika Marche, while the Garden Dining food court is located on the fourth floor of the mall. LaLaport BBCC features a number of attractions such as the Central Rooftop Garden, WOW Plaza, Gourmet Street, Grand Steps and Gate Plaza.

It was scheduled to open in 2021 but was further delayed due to the Movement Control Order caused by the COVID-19 pandemic in the country. The mall was officially open to the public on 20 January 2022, making it as the first LaLaport in Southeast Asia as well as the second LaLaport to open outside of Japan after LaLaport Shanghai Jinqiao.

References

2022 establishments in Malaysia
Shopping malls established in 2022
Shopping malls in Kuala Lumpur